The Tamanrasset River is an enormous palaeoriver believed to have flowed through West Africa as recently as 5000 years ago during the African humid period. The Tamanrasset River basin is thought to have been comparable with the present-day Ganges-Brahmaputra river basin in Asia.

Tributaries 
Western side:
 Oued Saoura
 Oued Namous
Eastern side:
 Oued Tamanrasset

Overview
The Tamanrasset is thought to have flowed across the Sahara in ancient times from sources in the southern Atlas mountains and Hoggar highlands in what is now Algeria.

It is thought the river fed into the Cap Timiris Canyon, located off the coast of Mauritania, the canyon is located in waters three kilometres deep and is 2.5km wide in places.

The presence of the river is thought to have had wide-ranging implications for human migration from Central Africa to the Middle East, Europe, and Asia. Previously, the inhospitable Sahara desert was believed to have made a western route for migrating to Europe unviable.

Researchers believe that the ancient river became active during the African Humid Period, climate oscillations caused by the Earth’s precessional orbit around the Sun.

The palaeoriver was discovered using a Japanese orbital satellite system called Phased Array type L-band Synthetic Aperture Radar (PALSAR). Using microwave sensing, PALSAR can see below Saharan sands and detect the fossil water still present.

Possible civilization 
The Tamanrasset is a possible location for an ancient Saharan civilization.  If such civilization exists, it is most likely buried under the sands of the Sahara, or not seen as it would be hard to find a stone building among a pebble desert. The existence and location of the Tamanrasset River was only confirmed by scientists in 2015, although an expedition looking for oil found the canyon that it could have made in 2003.

See also
Arak gorges
African humid period

References

External links

Former rivers